The Detroit Water and Sewerage Department (DWSD) is a public utility that provides water and sewerage services for Detroit, Michigan and owns the assets that provide water and sewerage services to 126 other communities in seven counties. It is one of the largest water and sewer systems in the United States. In 2000, the utility utilized five water treatment plants using water from the Detroit River and Lake Huron. In mid 2014, the DWSD had acquired significant debt and delinquent accounts, and talks of privatization were occurring. As of January 1, 2016, under the terms of the City of Detroit's municipal bankruptcy the Great Lakes Water Authority (GLWA) was created with a $50 million annual lease agreement to the City of Detroit for 40 years, while the DWSD bifurcated to focus its services specifically on the water and sewer customers within only the city of Detroit.

Overview

The Detroit Water and Sewerage Department is a sprawling network covering 1,079 square-miles, servicing more than 40 percent of the U.S. state of Michigan's population, and employing nearly 2,000 people.
The DWSD is one of the most extensive and largest water and sewage systems in the United States. Along with serving the entire city of Detroit, it also serves the counties of Genesee, Oakland, Macomb, Washtenaw, Wayne, St. Clair, Lapeer and Monroe. In 2000, the network comprised 11,000 miles of water mains and a storage capacity of 363 million gallons.

In 2000, the DWSD provided water for around four million customers in Detroit and its metropolitan area. At this time, the department utilized five water treatment plants that were fed from three raw water intakes, two of which were sourced from the Detroit River and one of which was sourced from Lake Huron. The water treatment plants used the technologies of "pre-chlorination, rapid mix, flocculation, sedimentation, filtration and chlorine disinfection". At this time, the five water treatment plants were Waterworks Park, Springwells, Northeast, Southwest and Lake Huron.

In a 1992 survey, "nine of the 119 water purveyors that receive DWSD water indicated that considerable amounts of unlined cast-iron pipe were in place", and that "two-thirds of the eighteen survey respondents also indicated that red/rusty water occurrences were the most common cause of customer complaints". This was associated with the occurrence of iron uptake in the pipes.

Contemporary issues
As of March 9, 2020, the City of Detroit has instituted a COVID-19 Water Restart Plan to keep water flowing during the pandemic. Residents are eligible for this plan if their water service was recently paused because they missed a payment or if they received a notice that their service may be interrupted. This plan is in effect until December 31, 2020, and it costs $25 per month. Normally, residents pay almost four times that amount. The Detroit Water and Sewage Department (DWSD) reports that in the first 90 days of the Water Restart Plan, service was restored to twelve hundred occupied homes. Even in non-covid times, many residents in Detroit struggle to pay their water bills which leads to shutoffs.

Detroit has been in a water crisis since 2014, the time that the city was in bankruptcy, when the DWSD shut off water of residents who had missed payments. In 2014, half of customers were behind on payments and the average amount of money customers who were behind on payments owed was $560. The numbers have only increased. One resident, Lisa Brooks, was in a payment plan with the DWSD that required her to pay $100 which amounted to 17% of her monthly income. Lisa missed some payments and turned to We The People of Detroit, an organization advocating for water justice, and relatives for assistance. Lisa is not alone in her reliance of others for water. 80% of Detroit residents who do not have access to water in their homes share or borrow water from friends and family which potentially creates a transmission path for the coronavirus. The safety of residents during the time of the pandemic was a major factor in the government's decision to enact the Water Restart Plan.

Separate from the COVID-19 Water Restart Plan, water activists have been fighting for a sliding-scale affordability program for water in Detroit for many years. Activists believe that this type of solution addresses the root of the problem which is that water rates are unaffordable for low-income households.  However, city officials oppose sliding-scale programs and instead continue to focus on individual assistance programs like the Water Residential Assistance Program. It is unclear what will happen to residents when the Water Restart Plan ends at the end of this year though it is clear that the push for a more affordable, sustainable urban water system in Detroit will continue.

, the Detroit Water and Sewerage Department has taken on significant debt and delinquent accounts, and has been under discussion for potential privatization. Efforts to collect on overdue billing has been characterized as an effort "to get rid of the bad debt associated with the water department and prep the public entity for privatization".

Per a June 2014 Democracy Now article:
The Detroit Water and Sewerage Department says half of its 323,000 accounts are delinquent and has begun turning off the taps of those who do not pay bills that total above $150 or that are 60 days late. Since March, up to 3,000 account holders have had their water cut off every week. The Detroit water authority carries an estimated $5 billion in debt and has been the subject of privatization talks.

Efforts to shut off water to delinquent corporate accounts have been tepid at best. "Vargo Golf, which operates Palmer Park Golf Course and Chandler Park Golf Course, under contract with the city of Detroit tops the list, with a delinquent account balance of $437,714. Another Vargo Golf account for a separate property has a delinquent balance of $100,528." On his Daily Show, Jon Stewart called out Ford Field and Joe Louis Arena on their delinquent DWSD accounts.

In June 2014, activists from the Blue Planet Project had filed a "submission to the United Nations Special Rapporteur on the human right to safe drinking water and sanitation ... activists say Detroit is trying to push through a private takeover of its water system at the expense of basic rights."

References

Further reading
 Factor screening for ozonating the taste- and odor-causing compounds in source water at Detroit, USA. Water Science and Technology. Pages 115–122.
 Tapped Out Detroit Residents in Water Fight With City. NBC News.
 The terrible choices Detroit confronts as it cuts off water to its own residents. The Washington Post.
 Who Bled Detroit Dry?. Vice.
 Detroit Plans Thousands Of Water Shutoffs Over Delinquent Bills. CBS Detroit.
 Detroit water chief says she's willing to sell emergency water to Flint -- no strings attached. MLive.

External links
 

Government of Detroit
Public utilities of the United States
Water management authorities in the United States
Local government in Michigan
Detroit River
Metro Detroit
Organizations based in Detroit
Privatization controversies